Baldies is a real-time strategy video game developed by Creative Edge Software and originally published by Atari Corporation for the Atari Jaguar CD in North America and Europe on December 1995. In the game, players build and manage a community of the titular short and plump bald characters with the ultimate goal of conquering the world by defeating similarly-looking short little hairy people known as the "Hairies". Its gameplay mainly consists of strategy taking place during real-time, combining both simulation and god game elements as well, while online multiplayer with up to four players using a modem or over a local area network is only supported on PC.

Conceived and written by Creative Edge Software founder David Wightman, Baldies originally started as a project intended for the Amiga platforms in early 1993 and was set to be released by Mindscape before publishing duties were transferred to GameTek instead, however this early version of the game was never officially released for unknown reasons until it was converted and completed on the Jaguar CD. Initially an exclusive for the add-on, it was later ported by Creative Edge to MS-DOS, Macintosh, Microsoft Windows, PlayStation and Sega Saturn between 1996 and 1998, all of which were released by several publishers across multiple regions and each one features various changes and additions compared with the original version respectively.

Baldies garnered generally positive reception after its release on the Jaguar CD; praise was lent to the novel style and the level of freedom given to players in doing anything, though the simplistic graphics and learning curve were a point of contention for critics. The game has been compared with titles such as Lemmings due to its premise and quirkiness. Ports for the 3DO Interactive Multiplayer and Amiga CD32 were also in development but never published. A sequel named Skull Caps, also developed by the same development team and published by Ubi Soft exclusively for Windows, was released in 1999 but had little success when compared to its predecessor.  Creative Edge Software went on to develop one more game; Dark Planet: Battle for Natrolis.

Gameplay 

Baldies is primarily a real-time strategy game with god and simulation elements that is played in a top-down perspective similar in vein to Warcraft: Orcs & Humans, Command & Conquer and Dungeon Keeper where the players, as the "master creator", interacts with the world and its titular inhabitants by controlling a hand/pointer cursor in order to builds and manage a community capable of defeating every unit of similarly-looking characters known as the "Hairies" and advance the Baldies' civilization further, which is the main aim of the game across multiple levels that are divided into 20 on five worlds, each one featuring a different thematic and increasing in difficulty as the players progress along the way. This is achieved by constructing houses which breed Baldies and by placing them in a specific room with the hand, these also allows to assign a new job or task for them, which is denoted by the color of their clothing that represents their specific role and after this, the players may construct a barracks or a scientist lab.

There are four types of Baldies in total; The red ones are workers that will generate enough useful energy in order to terraform the playfield and to unlock the angel wings in order of granting them the ability to fly, which is achieved after constructing four big houses. The blue ones act as builders capable of upgrading the original starting house at the beginning of a level or build new houses, while they can also maintain the structures from falling apart by multiple disasters. The grey ones function as soldiers capable of fighting against the Hairies and they can also be equipped with weapons outside of barracks during their first phase, while white ones work as scientists at labs that research and develop new weapons and inventions that are both beneficial and harmful for their race, many of which are created by experimenting with the various animals found within the playfield of the game world that are useful against the enemy race. Players can also change the role of their Baldies by dropping them into a specific room of a house, with the bedroom being the only way to breed more. Without any kind of structure, players are incapable of breeding Baldies, develop inventions or fabricate ammunition and once all of the Baldies in the playfield are defeated by the Hairies, the game is over.

Unlike other traditional titles released in the era, Baldies does not feature fog of war, allowing players to observe the playfield instead of being hidden from them at the beginning of a level in order to plan a strategy against enemy units beforehand. Players also do not have full, direct control of the Baldies themselves and their actions or movement, instead, they will wander aimlessly around the playfield until they are picked up with the hand. Players can also use trees on the playfield to hide Baldies for strategic purposes against the Hairies. In addition, players also have god-like powers capable of changing the outcome of a unit. Prior to starting a playthrough, players can choose any of the levels unlocked in the main menu. In the original Jaguar CD version, either passwords or the Memory Track cartridge are used for game save, while only memory cards are supported in later console versions. Online multiplayer with up to four players via modem or over a local area network (LAN) is only featured in the PC release of the game, where any of the campaign levels are selectable and the last unit standing is the winner of the match.

Development 

Baldies originally began its development in February 1993 as a project intended to be released for the Amiga microcomputers by Mindscape in December 1994. Publishing duties were moved on to GameTek, and the game was now planned to be released in April/May 1995 instead. This initial incarnation of the game featured different visuals from the final version and was spearheaded by lead programmer and Creative Edge Software founder David Wightman. Several people were also involved with the development of the project on Amiga such as technical manager David Elliott and programmers Daniel Leyden, Duncan MacDonald and Sean Connolly while artists Alan Duncan, David Brown and Paul Docherty were responsible for creating the hand-drawn in-game artwork respectively. This early version of the project was never released for unknown reasons, and the game was transferred and finished on the Atari Jaguar CD instead as early as June 1995. In various online interviews, Wightman stated that his development company obtained development kits for the Jaguar from Atari Corporation and that programming of the unreleased Amiga version was directly converted to the Jaguar CD, as 90% of its code was written in the Assembly programming language, and rewritten in order to work with the Jaguar's multi-chip architecture. The Jaguar CD version was also co-produced by Vince Zampella. The claymation cutscenes were produced in-house by Creative Edge.

Release 
Baldies was first announced to be released for the Atari Jaguar CD as early as May 1995 and it was showcased across both editions of the European Computer Trade Show in the same year, with plans for a Q2/Q3 1995 release. The Jaguar CD version was covered by the video game magazines that were invited to Atari Corp.'s US and UK divisions and was now planned to be released in late 1995. Internal documents from Atari revealed that this version remained in development as of December 1995, despite being released that same month. David Wightman has since stated that this version of the game was originally intended to be shipped with a computer mouse peripheral for use in-game. It is unknown if the final release does feature mouse support. However, it came packaged with a full color overlay to be used for the game. It also features support for the ProController. It is the smallest game released for the add-on in terms of memory size (at 75 MB). Ports for the Amiga CD32 and 3DO Interactive Multiplayer were previewed and slated to be published in April/May 1995 alongside the original Amiga version, but these were never released by GameTek. It was ported to PC, PlayStation and Sega Saturn.

The PC version of Baldies was originally going to be published by Atari Corp's newly formed PC publishing division Atari Interactive, but due to the closure of the company in April 1996, it was instead published first in North America by Panasonic Interactive Media on 28 November 1996, then in Europe by Sold-Out Software on 13 February 1997 and in Japan by Banpresto on 4 December of the same year. This version, developed by Creative Edge, features a reworked visual style compared to the Jaguar CD version and is the only port that supports online multiplayer for up to four players. Part of Panasonic's marketing campaign for the game was a tour of bald-haired promoters distributing free demos of the game in New York after its release. The PlayStation version was the second console version of the game to be developed by the same team. It was first released in Japan by Banpresto on 19 November 1998, then in Europe by Phoenix Games on 8 August 2003 and in North America by Mud Duck Productions on 3 October of the same year. Its visuals are based upon the PC version and it features support for the PlayStation Mouse. The Sega Saturn port was only released in Japan by Banpresto on 26 November 1998, becoming both the last version of the game to be officially released and the final version developed by the original team. It features visuals similar to those found in the PlayStation version and likewise, it also supports the Shuttle Mouse.

Reception 

The four reviewers of Electronic Gaming Monthly criticized that the graphics are mediocre and the controls are difficult to get used to, but summarized the game as "a step in the right direction" for the Jaguar with its challenging strategy and many amusing tactics for defeating enemies. A review in GamePro took a reverse position, saying that the graphics are excellent and the controls are simple and easy to master, but that the music is too repetitive. They called the game "a great sim for beginners." A Next Generation critic relentlessly praised the game. He found its greatest strength to be the freedom of the gameplay, which allows the player to delegate responsibilities any way they like among the baldies or enjoy the unpredictability of what they come up with when given only general guidance. He summarized, "Featuring cute graphics, literally hundreds of levels, and a novel game premise, this title is definitely a game worthy of a second look."

In a review of the PC version, Chris Hudak of GameSpot called the game "the single weirdest game I have ever played", criticizing the concept as well as the execution of the game.

Legacy 
Baldies was the only completed title by Creative Edge Software for the Atari Jaguar platform and formed part from a string of projects that were in development but never officially released by Atari Corporation on their console and possibly for other systems as well; Battle Lords (a Gauntlet-style hack and slash dungeon crawler), Chopper (a Choplifter-esque 3D action game), Green-Thang (a B.O.B.-inspired run and gun platformer) and an unverified soccer title that were all nearly completed. A sequel, Skull Caps, was developed by Creative Edge and published by Ubi Soft for Windows only in 1999 to mixed reception. In March 2006, three years after the release of the PlayStation port in western regions, the trademark renewal for Baldies was cancelled.

Notes

References

External links 
 
 Baldies at AtariAge
 Baldies at GameFAQs
 Baldies at Giant Bomb
 Baldies at MobyGames

1995 video games
Atari Jaguar CD games
Cancelled 3DO Interactive Multiplayer games
Cancelled Amiga games
Cancelled Amiga CD32 games
Construction and management simulation games
Creative Edge Software games
DOS games
God games
Classic Mac OS games
Multiplayer and single-player video games
PlayStation (console) games
Real-time strategy video games
Sega Saturn games
Video games developed in the United Kingdom
Windows games
Mud Duck Productions games
Banpresto games
Atari games